The women's road time trial H4–5 road cycling event at the 2020 Summer Paralympics took place on 31 August 2021, at Fuji Speedway, Tokyo. 12 riders competed in the event.

The event covers the following two classifications, that both use hand-operated bicycles:
H4: paraplegics with impairment from T11 down, and amputees unable to kneel.
H5: athletes who can kneel on a handcycle, a category that includes paraplegics and amputees.

Results
The event took place on 31 August 2021, at 9:59:

References

Women's road time trial H4-5